Axel Theodor Wikström (29 September 1907 – 16 June 1976) was a Swedish cross-country skier who won two Olympic silver medals: one in the 18 km in 1932 and the other in the 50 km event in 1936.

Wikström never won an individual Swedish title, but he did win the 30 km team competition in 1936, and earlier in March 1935 became the first foreigner to win the 50 km race at the Lahti Ski Games. He was also known for preparing ski tracks for the local competitions, such as the 1946 Swedish Championships.

Cross-country skiing results
All results are sourced from the International Ski Federation (FIS).

Olympic Games
 2 medals – (2 silver)

References

External links 
 

1907 births
1976 deaths
People from Skellefteå Municipality
Cross-country skiers from Västerbotten County
Swedish male cross-country skiers
Cross-country skiers at the 1932 Winter Olympics
Cross-country skiers at the 1936 Winter Olympics
Olympic cross-country skiers of Sweden
Olympic silver medalists for Sweden
Olympic medalists in cross-country skiing
Medalists at the 1932 Winter Olympics
Medalists at the 1936 Winter Olympics